A shapeshifter is a mythic being that can change its physical shape.

Shapeshifter or Shapeshifters may also refer to:

Books and comics
 The Shapeshifter, a 2006 book by Ali Sparkes
 The Shape Shifter, a 2006 novel by Tony Hillerman
 Shape-Shifter (book), a 1990 a collection of short stories by Pauline Melville

Film and television 
 Shapeshifter (film), a 2005 horror film
 Shapeshifter (1999 film), a 1999 family film starring Emmanuelle Vaugier
 Founders (Star Trek), or "Shapeshifters", a race of so-called "changelings" from Star Trek

Music

Groups
The Shapeshifters, a British electronic music group
Shapeshifter (band), a New Zealand drum and bass group
The Shape Shifters, a hip hop group from Los Angeles

Albums 
Shapeshifter (Gong album), 1992 album
Shapeshifter (Marcy Playground album), 1999 album
Shapeshifter (Space Tribe album), 2001 album
Shapeshifter, a 2003 album by Tempest
Shapeshifter (The Contortionist EP), 2008 album
Shapeshifting (Young Galaxy album), a 2011 album by Young Galaxy
Shapeshifting (Joe Satriani album), a 2020 album and its title track by Joe Satriani
Shape Shifter (album), 2012 album
Shapeshifter (The Dead Rabbitts album), 2014 album
Shapeshifter (Smile Empty Soul EP), 2016 album
 Shapeshifter (Knuckle Puck album), 2017 album

Songs
 "Shapeshifter", a 1982 song by Level 42 on the album The Pursuit of Accidents
 "Shapeshifter", a song by Septicflesh on the 2003 album Sumerian Daemons
 "Shapeshifter", a 2005 song by Cave In
 "Shapeshifter", a 2005 song by Celldweller
 "Shapeshifter", a song by The Contortionist on the 2008 EP Shapeshifter
 "Shapeshifter", a song by Haken on the 2011 album Visions
 "Shape Shifter", a song by Amon Amarth on the 2013 album Deceiver of the Gods
 "Shape Shifter", a song by They Might Be Giants on their 2016 album Phone Power
 "Shape-Shifter", a song by Within the Ruins on the 2017 album Halfway Human
 "Shapeshifter", a song by Alessia Cara on the 2021 album In the Meantime
 "Shapeshifter", a song by Upon a Burning Body on the 2022 album Fury

Computing 
ShapeShifter, defunct software developed by Unsanity
ShapeShifter (animation), a web based animation service
Shapeshifter (software), a clipboard manager by Flamefusion
ShapeShifter, a Macintosh II Emulator for AmigaOS.

See also
Shapeshifting (Young Galaxy album), a 2011 album by Young Galaxy